The men's individual pursuit competition at the 2020 UEC European Track Championships was held on 14 November 2020.

Results

Qualifying
The first two racers raced for gold, the third and fourth fastest rider raced for the bronze medal.

Finals

References

Men's individual pursuit
European Track Championships – Men's individual pursuit